Osadeni Dushi is a 1975 Bulgarian  epic film, written and directed by Vulo Radev based on the 1945 novel by Dimitar Dimov, and starring Jan Englert, Rousy Chanev, Mariana Dimitrova, and Edit Szalay.

Plot outline
The film tells the tragic story of British noblewoman Fanny Horn (Edit Szalay) and Jesuit priest Heredia (Jan Englert) against the backdrop of the Spanish Civil War. A rich young aristocrat who has spent her preceding years in a decadent lifestyle, Fanny falls in love with Heredia; however, although the priest feels the same, he places his fanatical devotion to his faith above their attraction. Fanny follows Heredia to a typhus outbreak at a camp near Pena Ronda and volunteers to work as a nurse under his command and to finance the camp. Nevertheless, the conditions at the camp are appalling and deteriorate sharply as the civil war begins. Fanny gradually becomes increasingly desperate with the fanatic and inhumane behaviour of Heredia, who turns out to be deeply involved in the plotting of the anti-republican side in the civil war. As Heredia continues to reject her love, and as she eventually witnesses his fanaticism take several human victims, Fanny shoots him. Her psychological breakdown has led her to begin taking morphine, which will eventually lead to her own demise.

Cast
 Jan Englert as Father Heredia
 Rousy Chanev as Jacques Muriet
 Mariana Dimitrova as Carmen
 Edit Szalay as Fanny Horn
 Valcho Kamarashev as Father Olivares
 Silvija Rangelova as Clara

Reception
Speaking toward Minister Vezhdi Rashidov's visit to Poland to present actor Jan Englert with a lifetime achievement award, Fakti called the film a "Bulgarian classic", and Dnevnik marked the film as among the top 10 most beloved films of Bulgaria.

References

External links

 A fan site with some pictures from the movie (in Bulgarian language). 

1970s Bulgarian-language films
Bulgarian war films
1975 films
Films based on Bulgarian novels
Spanish Civil War
1975 drama films
1970s war drama films
Bulgarian drama films